Shenzhen College of International Education, more widely known by its acronym SCIE, is an international high school situated by the Antuo hill, in Futian District, Shenzhen, China. The school offers a four-year high-school program, adopting mainly Cambridge Assessment International Education (CAIE) IGCSE and GCE A-level curriculums, and are taught mostly in English.

According to a 2020 ranking of Chinese international high schools, SCIE ranked first in mainland China in terms of competitiveness in UK undergraduate applications, and tenth for US undergraduate applications.

Foundation
The Shenzhen College of International Education was established in 2003 with the approval of the Shenzhen Educational Department, and it was the first full-time Chinese international college to be accredited by Cambridge Assessment International Education (CAIE).

Academic achievements

UK undergraduate applications 
According to statistics published on the SCIE website (2017-2022) and data published elsewhere (2005-2017), a table of the numbers of SCIE G5 offers is given in the following:

Up to the year 2022, SCIE has received in total 115 offers from The University of Oxford, and 156 offers from The University of Cambridge.

US undergraduate applications 

In recent years, SCIE students have received offers from well-known top US universities such as Stanford University, Johns Hopkins University, Cornell University, University of Chicago, University of Pennsylvania, et cetera.

Hong Kong SAR undergraduate applications

International examinations 
Furthermore, SCIE students have excelled in international examinations, especially IGCSE and A-Level examinations. Throughout the course of 16 years, SCIE has received 103 Top in the World awards and 162 Top in the Country awards.

Campus
 
Before Summer 2020, the SCIE campus was at Shuiwei, a small area immediately to the north of the Huanggang Port between Shenzhen (mainland China) and Hong Kong SAR. This was commonly referred to as the Shuiwei campus (old campus). In August 2020, the students and faculty of SCIE have moved into the new campus, which is the current campus, sitting by Antuo Hill, or alternatively, Antuoshan.

Language
Since its inception, SCIE has followed a policy known as "The English Policy," which states that all academic staff and students must use English as their primary language on campus due to the international nature of the school. Because of this policy, the majority of lessons are taught in English (with the exception of P.E. and Chinese). Students are becoming more willing to follow this policy as time goes on, owing to the nature of overseas studies' demanding language skills requirements. Because of the introduction of multilingual lessons in SCIE, Spanish, French, and Japanese are also used.

SCIE students are known to have exceptional English language skills. In a 2018 report published by British Council, SCIE students have the highest average IELTS score (6.9) out of all international schools in mainland China.

Faculty
Currently, there are 146 teachers, including both Chinese and foreign teachers. With 1314 students, the faculty-student ratio is 1:9.

Extracurricular academic achievements
SCIE students have always been active in numerous international competitions. Some of which are listed in the following:

Tuition fees
The annual tuition fee for the academic year 2021-2022 is 238,000 RMB, which includes physical examination fees, insurance fees, and fees for extracurricular activities but excludes international examination fees and field trip fees.

See also
 Education in Shenzhen

References

External links
 SCIE official English website
 SCIE official Chinese website

British international schools in China
Education in Shenzhen
International schools in Shenzhen
Cambridge schools in China
Futian District